Sir John Edmond Gough  (25 October 1871 – 22 February 1915), was an early 20th century British Army General, and a recipient of the Victoria Cross, the highest award for gallantry in the face of the enemy that can be awarded to British and Commonwealth forces.

Early military career
Gough, known as "Johnnie", was the son of General Sir Charles Gough, and nephew of General Sir Hugh Gough, both of whom won Victoria Crosses during the Indian Mutiny in 1857. This gave the family the rare distinction of holding the VC simultaneously by father, brother and (father's) son. He was also the younger brother of General Sir Hubert Gough (1870–1963), who led the British Fifth Army on the Western Front during the First World War.

Gough was commissioned a second lieutenant in the Rifle Brigade (The Prince Consort's Own) on 12 March 1891, and promoted to lieutenant on 6 December 1893. He served in British Central Africa in 1896, the Sudan in 1898, and took part in the Occupation of Crete (1898–99). Promoted to captain on 5 December 1898, he served in the Second Boer War from 1899 until 1902, and received a brevet rank of major on 29 November 1900. In late 1902 he left the United Kingdom for Berbera, to be a Staff Officer in a Flying column in the Somaliland Field Force, serving in British Somaliland during the Third Somaliland Expedition. He attended the Army Staff College at Camberley in 1904–05, was back in Somaliland in 1909, then returned to the college as an influential lecturer on war studies from 1909 to 1913.

Award of the Victoria Cross
Gough was 31 years old, and a brevet major in The Rifle Brigade (Prince Consort's Own) during the Third Somaliland Expedition when the following event took place for which he was awarded the Victoria Cross.

On 22 April 1903, Gough was in command of a column on the march which was attacked by an enemy force in superior numbers, that is the Darawiish army of Diiriye Guure near Daratoleh, British Somaliland. After conducting a successful defence, then a fighting withdrawal, Gough came back to help two captains (William George Walker and George Murray Rolland).  The captains were helping a mortally wounded officer. They managed to get the wounded officer onto a camel, but then he was wounded again and died immediately.  The two captains won the VC for their actions.  However, Gough played down his own part in the event.  It was not until late in the year that the true story came out indicating that Gough was equally deserving of recognition.  He was subsequently awarded the Victoria Cross in January 1904. The King Edward VII presented the medal to him at Buckingham Palace on 29 February 1904. He was appointed an Aide-de-Camp to the King in August 1907.

Curragh Incident
Prior to the outbreak of the First World War, Gough was Chief of Staff to Lieutenant-General Sir Douglas Haig at Aldershot Command. He played a role in the Curragh Incident in March 1914, in which his brother and other cavalry officers stationed in Ireland threatened to resign rather than coerce Ulster Protestants who had no wish to be part of an Irish state governed from Dublin. Gough accompanied his brother, who had been suspended from duty, to a meeting in London with the Adjutant-General Ewart on the morning of Sunday 22 March 1914, where Hubert confirmed that he would have obeyed a direct order to move against the Ulster population. Johnnie was in the War Office on 23 March, when French (CIGS) agreed to Hubert's demand that he amend a Cabinet document to promise that the British Army would not be used to enforce Irish Home Rule on Ulster. French may have been acting in the belief that the matter needed to be resolved quickly after learning from Haig that afternoon that all the officers of Aldershot Command would resign if Hubert were punished.

First World War

Gough went to France as a Brigadier-General in mid-August 1914 with the British Expeditionary Force, as Chief-of-Staff to Douglas Haig's I Corps. In early 1915 he continued as Haig's principal staff officer when Haig was given command of the newly created British First Army. By February 1915 whilst working on planning for the forthcoming attack at Neuve Chapelle, Gough was chosen to command one of the British New Army divisions. This appointment was due to commence sometime in March 1915 and would have entailed his promotion to the rank of Major-General.

Death
On 20 February 1915 Gough was visiting his old Battalion, the 2nd Battalion, The Rifle Brigade, in the line at Fauquissart, about 3 km north of Neuve Chapelle, about 2 km west of Aubers to luncheon at its H.Q.'s Officers' Mess before his imminent departure to the British Isles to assume the command of a new division. Whilst in the line he was hit in the abdomen by a chance ricochet of a German bullet which mortally wounded him. The event was an unlucky one as the bullet that struck him was thought to have been a single shot fired from approximately 1000 yards away from somewhere in the German lines. He was conveyed to the 25th Field Ambulance at nearby Estaires, about 7 km behind the front line, where he succumbed to the wound and died in the early morning of 22 February 1915. His body was buried that afternoon in Estaires Communal Cemetery, located 7 miles to the South-West of Armentières, in Plot II, Row A, Grave No. 7. On 20 April 1915 Gough was posthumously knighted, being gazetted KCB on 22 April 1915.

Assessments
Gough was quoted as making a famous remark in November 1914 that was to be repeated as inspirational in the dark days of March 1918. "As he watched the enemy swarming over a low ridge one of his staff said the fight was decided. Gough turned with his eyes ablaze and exclaimed: 'God will never let those devils win.'"  "Through Johnnie's death Haig lost a sounding board which was highly constructive yet far from uncritical. Had Johnnie gone on to command a division then it seems almost certain that, as predicted by so many contemporaries, he would have risen much further in the army. Johnnie was a convinced 'westerner' in strategic terms and a 'fighting general'. The army high command's commitment to the Western Front and to strategic offensives on that front would not have changed had Johnnie lived, but as he had demonstrated in his Staff College days he was a supreme realist and the conduct of these offensives might well have been modified by his influence with and, especially, by his ability to relate to Douglas Haig."

A contemporary, General Sir George Barrow, described John Gough as "a twentieth-century Chevalier Bayard, had he lived he might have gone to the top of the British Army". To some extent Hubert Gough replaced his brother as Haig's sounding board.

Memorials

There is a memorial to Gough in Winchester Cathedral; his Victoria Cross medal is displayed at the Royal Green Jackets (Rifles) Museum, in Winchester, England.

Notes

References

 
Irish Winners of the Victoria Cross (Richard Doherty & David Truesdale, 2000)
Johnnie Gough, VC (Ian F.W. Beckett, 1989)
Commonwealth War Graves Commission
Monuments to Courage (David Harvey, 1999)
The Register of the Victoria Cross (This England, 1997)

1871 births
1915 deaths
British Army generals of World War I
Knights Commander of the Order of the Bath
Companions of the Order of St Michael and St George
British Army personnel of the Second Boer War
British recipients of the Victoria Cross
British military personnel killed in World War I
Rifle Brigade officers
British Army personnel of the Mahdist War
British military personnel of the Third Somaliland Expedition
People from Murree
British military personnel of the 1898 Occupation of Crete
British Army recipients of the Victoria Cross
Irish recipients of the Victoria Cross
British Army brigadiers
Military personnel of British India
Graduates of the Staff College, Camberley
Academics of the Staff College, Camberley
Burials in Hauts-de-France